Ettore Muro Chimeri (4 June 1921 – 27 February 1960) was a racing driver from Venezuela. He was born in Lodi, near Milan, Italy, but his family later settled in Venezuela. He was the first Venezuelan ever to compete in a Formula One Grand Prix.

He became a popular gentleman racing driver and competed with success in many local races in Venezuela. He raced in the Venezuelan Grand Prix held in Los Proceres, Caracas.  His success and skill in car racing, gave him the enthusiasm for keep going forward, and he started an international professional promotion, racing sport cars and one-seater cars.

He participated in one Formula One World Championship Grand Prix, the 1960 Argentine Grand Prix on 7 February 1960, in his Maserati 250F (a car he owned, previously raced by Juan Manuel Fangio and Francisco Godia, prepared in Venezuela and sold to an Italian buyer sometime after his death) failing to finish the race having experienced electrical problems. He scored no championship points, but he wished to keep going in the Formula One calendar that year.

Two weeks later, while practicing for the Gran Premio Libertad sports car race at the Camp Freedom military airfield on the edge of Havana, his Ferrari 250TR crashed through barriers and plunged  into a ravine. Chimeri was flown to hospital, where he died later that day.

Chimeri was the first Venezuelan driver entered into a Formula One Grand Prix, and the local interest in him and his sporting career has kept his memory alive. In 2004 some local motorwriters gave him enough votes to take a place in the "Salón de la Fama del Automovilismo Venezolano" organized by the local motor press writers organization FUNDAUTO.

Complete Formula One World Championship results
(key)

References

External links
F1 Rejects profile
Grand Prix encyclopedia profile

1921 births
1960 deaths
Italian emigrants to Venezuela
Venezuelan racing drivers
Venezuelan Formula One drivers
Racing drivers who died while racing
Sport deaths in Cuba
People from Lodi, Lombardy
Sportspeople from the Province of Lodi